PLATFORM ARCHITECTURE AND DESIGN is a nationally distributed magazine looking at design, architecture and interiors. The magazine was first published in March 2015.  It targets architects, designers, interior design professionals and enthusiasts.

It presents the best of Italian design, creativity and style, while closely following international trends and bringing together ideas and new directions.

References

External links
Official website

2015 establishments in Italy
Architecture magazines
Bi-monthly magazines published in Italy
Magazines established in 2015
Magazines published in Milan